The 1988 United States Senate election in Wyoming was held on November 8, 1988. Incumbent Republican Senator Malcolm Wallop ran for re-election to a third term. He was opposed by Democratic State Senator John Vinich in the general election. Despite Wallop's past strong performances in 1976 and 1982, and the overwhelming Republican majority in Wyoming in the presidential election, Wallop faced a surprisingly competitive race. He ended up defeating Vinich by less than 1%, by a margin of just 1,322 votes. , this was the strongest performance by a Democratic nominee for the U.S. Senate in Wyoming since 1970, the last time a Democrat won a Senate election in the state.

Democratic primary

Candidates
 John Vinich, State Senator
 Pete Maxfield, former Dean of the University of Wyoming School of Law 
 Lynn Simons, Wyoming Superintendent of Instruction

Results

Republican Primary

Candidates
 Malcolm Wallop, incumbent U.S. Senator
 Nora Marie Lewis, farmer 
 Bud Kinney, perennial candidate
 Michael J. Dee, perennial candidate, marijuana legalization advocate
 Russ Hanrahan, retired air traffic controller

Results

General election

Results

References

1988
Wyoming
United States Senate